Romina Lanaro (born October 19, 1986) is an Argentine fashion model.

She was born in Rosario, Santa Fe, and began to work as model at the age of 14 when she moved to Buenos Aires. At 17 years old she moved to Paris and then to Milan where she worked for notable designers and fashion houses, such as Prada, Armani, Chloé, Emanuel Ungaro, Elie Saab, Chanel, Christian Dior, Christian Lacroix, Gucci, Jean Paul Gaultier, Paco Rabanne, Versace and Viktor and Rolf and magazines like Numéro, Marie Claire, ELLE, Harper's Bazaar UK, Allure and German and Spanish Vogue. She has appeared in many advertisement campaigns, including Alessandro Dell'Acqua, Dolce & Gabbana and Mulberry.

Personal 
On Saturday, 27 December 2008, Lanaro married model Federico Moyano in La Plata, Argentina. Their son, Máximo, was born on 22 September 2010.

References

External links
 
 
 

Argentine female models
Living people
1986 births
21st-century Argentine women